Qamışlıgöl (also, Gamyshlygël, Gamyshlygël’, and Kamyshly-Gel) is a village and municipality in the Jalilabad Rayon of Azerbaijan.  It has a population of 459.

References 

Populated places in Jalilabad District (Azerbaijan)